The 2014 World Junior Ice Hockey Championship Division III tournament was played in İzmir, Turkey, from 12 to 18 January 2014. Division III represents the sixth tier of the World Junior Ice Hockey Championships.

Participants

Final standings

Results
All times are local (EET – UTC+02).

References

External links
IIHF.com

III
World Junior Ice Hockey Championships – Division III
International ice hockey competitions hosted by Turkey
World